The men's high jump event at the 2003 Summer Universiade was held on 26–28 August in Daegu, South Korea.

Medalists

Results

Qualification

Final

References
Results

Athletics at the 2003 Summer Universiade
2003